Accreditation Council may refer to:

 Accreditation Council for Continuing Medical Education
 Accreditation Council for Graduate Medical Education, the body responsible for the accreditation of medical doctors in the US
 Accreditation Council for Pharmacy Education, a non-profit accreditation agency recognized by Council on Higher Education Accreditation in the US
 Accreditation Council for TESOL Distance Education Courses, quality assurance organization for TESOL distance-learning 
 British Accreditation Council, an educational accreditation agency for international students entering the UK for educational purposes
 Higher Education Evaluation and Accreditation Council of Taiwan
 National Assessment and Accreditation Council, an autonomous body funded by University Grants Commission of Government of India
 Oman Accreditation Council
 Pakistan National Accreditation Council

See also
 Accreditation